Temtsiltu Shobtsood (born August 1956) or Temtselt Shobshuud, also known as his Chinese name Xi Haiming, is an ethnic Mongol activist who campaign for independence of "Southern Mongolia" (China's Inner Mongolia Autonomous Region). Now he is the chairman of Inner Mongolian People's Party.

Temtsiltu was born in Naiman Banner, a banner in Tongliao, Inner Mongolia. In early 1981, while at university he joined the Inner Mongolian student movement together with Hada, Huchuntegus and Wang Manlai, which was campaigning to preserve Mongolian identity in Inner Mongolia under Chinese law. Due to his activities, the Chinese authorities put him under surveillance.

He graduated from Inner Mongolia Normal University and obtained his bachelor's degree in history in 1982. He founded the Inner Mongolian League for the Defense of Human Rights in 1987, and opened a Mongolian studies bookstore in Hohhot in 1990. In 1991, he was arrested together with Huchuntegus and many of his friends by the Chinese government. Later, he and Huchuntegus fled to Mongolia. He was granted political asylum in Germany in 1993.

In 1997, he started the Inner Mongolian People's Party in Princeton, New Jersey, the goal of which is to attain independence for Inner Mongolia. He currently lives in Germany together with his wife and daughter.

See also
Inner Mongolian independence movement

References

1956 births
Living people
People from Tongliao
Mongolian independence activists
Inner Mongolian independence movement
Mongolian expatriates in Germany